Erkki Oja (born 22 March 1948) is a Finnish computer scientist and Aalto Distinguished Professor in the Department of Information and Computer Science at Aalto University School of Science. He is recognized for developing Oja's rule, which is a model of how neurons in the brain or in artificial neural networks learn over time.

Education and career 
Oja was born in Helsinki and studied at Helsinki University of Technology, where he received his diploma engineer in 1972, licentiate in technology in 1975 and Doctor of Technology in 1977. He was a research associate at the Center for Cognitive Science at Brown University between 1977 and 1978 and a research fellow at the Academy of Finland from 1976 to 1981. Since 1981, he took up a professorship in applied mathematics at Kuopio University (now University of Eastern Finland). He was a visiting research scholar at Tokyo Institute of Technology from 1983 to 1984. From 1987 to 1993, he was a professor in computer science at the Lappeenranta University of Technology. He moved back to the Helsinki University of Technology (now Aalto University) from 1993 as a professor in computer science. He retired in 2015.

Honors and awards 
Oja is a Fellow of the International Association for Pattern Recognition and the IEEE, and a member of the Finnish Academy of Sciences. He served as chairman of the European Neural Network Society between 2000 and 2005, and as the chairman of the Academy of Finland’s Research Council for Natural Sciences and Engineering between 2007 and 2012. He was awarded the Frank Rosenblatt Award for his contributions to artificial intelligence research in 2019.

Oja was a member of the Board of Governors for the International Neural Network Society (INNIS) in 2003. He received honorary doctorates from Uppsala University and Lappeenranta University of Technology in 2008.

Bibliography

References

1948 births
Living people
Aalto University alumni
Academic staff of Aalto University
Academic staff of Lappeenranta University of Technology
Academic staff of the University of Eastern Finland
Brown University people
Fellow Members of the IEEE
Fellows of the International Association for Pattern Recognition
Finnish computer scientists
Machine learning researchers
Members of the Finnish Academy of Science and Letters